I Wish You Knew may refer to:
"I Wish You Knew", a 1960 song by the Louvin Brothers from My Baby's Gone
"I Wish You Knew", a 2005 song by Mariah Carey from The Emancipation of Mimi
"I Wish You Knew", a 2009 song by Some & Amy from First Shot

See also
"You Wish You Knew", a 2018 song by Zayn from Icarus Falls